This article is a list of the highest-grossing films of Iranian cinema that could get box office record. Currently Solitary directed by Seyed Masoud Atyabi is the highest-grossing Iranian movie in Iran history in the first year of release and excluding inflation. Deportees 2 (Masoud Dehnamaki, 2008) with 5/3 million viewer is the highest-grossing Iranian movie in the first year of release and Eagles (Samuel Khachikian, 1984) with 10/2 million viewer is the highest-grossing movie in Iran during the release years in cinema.

Highest-grossing films

Highest-grossing films adjusted for inflation

High-grossing films by year

Timeline of highest-grossing films

See also 

 List of highest-grossing films
 Lists of highest-grossing films

Endnotes

Notes

References

Sources 

 
 
 
 
 
 
 
 
 
 
 
 
 
 
 
 
 
 
 
 
 
 
 
 
 
 
 
 
 
 
 
 
 
 
 

 
Iran